Arda Arsenian Ekmekji is a Lebanese Armenian scholar. Ekmekji, was born in Jerusalem in 1951, and lived in Jordan until 1968 . She is a holder of a Lebanese citizenship and currently resides in Beirut. She has an MA in archaeology from the American University of Beirut (AUB) and a PhD in the same field from the University of Paris I-Pantheon- Sorbonne in Paris. She taught archaeology, ancient religions, civilizations and cultural studies at AUB for two decades before accepting a position at Haigazian University where she has served as the Dean of Arts and Sciences since 1998.
Ekmekji has also been a member of the National Commission for Electoral Reform ( Boutros Commission 2006), Member of the Lebanese Supervisory Commission of Elections (2009, 2018).

Her research interests include  electoral reform, Prehistoric Armenia and the Kingdom of Urartu. She also works on oral histories of the Armenian genocide and gender studies (with a focus on education).

Publications

 Towards Golgotha, The Memoirs of Hagop Arsenian, a Genocide Survivor. (HUP 2011, 2015).
 Confessionalism and Electoral Reform in Lebanon (The Aspen Institute, July 2012)
 Les relations archéologiques entre les cités Urartéennes et les états du Nord de la Syrie entre le VIIIe et le VIe siècle [avant] [Jésus]-[Christ] , 1994- Paris I - Pantheon - Sorbonne

References

Year of birth missing (living people)
Living people
Lebanese people of Armenian descent
20th-century Armenian women
21st-century Armenian women
Armenian scholars
People from Jerusalem
American University of Beirut alumni
Academic staff of the American University of Beirut
Paris-Sorbonne University alumni
Academic staff of Haigazian University
Armenian women archaeologists